John Sedgwick Gregson  GC (4 January 1924 – 25 December 2016) was an apprentice in the British Merchant Navy who was awarded the Albert Medal during World War II. This was later replaced with the George Cross.

Gregson served aboard the MV Deucalion as part of Operation Pedestal, a British operation to carry supplies to the island of Malta in August 1942. On the morning of 12 August Deucalion and other elements of the convoy came under attack off the Tunisian coast.

An account of the Deucalion attack, and notice of Gregson's Albert Medal award was published in the London Gazette on 2 February 1943.—

Later life

Gregson moved to New Zealand in 1952, where he worked on the coastal tanker fleet, and later became a harbour pilot with the Port of Tauranga. He died on Christmas day 2016 aged 92.

References

1924 births
2016 deaths
Recipients of the Albert Medal (lifesaving)
British recipients of the George Cross
British Merchant Navy personnel of World War II
People from Tauranga
British people in colonial India
British emigrants to New Zealand
Survivors of seafaring accidents or incidents